À la carte is a French expression meaning "from the card", and is used in restaurant terminology.

A la Carte may also refer to:

A La Carte (group), a German disco trio formed in 1978
A la Carte (Triumvirat album), 1978
À la Carte (Erste Allgemeine Verunsicherung album), 1984
A la Carte (Kenny Burrell album)
À la carte (EP), a 2002 EP by Fujifabric
Alacarte, a GNOME menu editor
"A La Cart", an episode of the American crime drama CSI: Crime Scene Investigation 
A-la-carte, a music service selling individual songs
A la carte pay television, a pricing model where cable and satellite television customers subscribe to individually selected channels

See also

 
 Carte (disambiguation)
 Card (disambiguation)